Michael John Adamson (born 6 September 1949) is a Scottish retired footballer who played in the Scottish League for Brechin City and Queen's Park as a forward. He was capped by Scotland at amateur level.

Career statistics

References 

Scottish footballers
Scottish Football League players
Queen's Park F.C. players
Association football forwards
Scotland amateur international footballers
1949 births
Living people
Brechin City F.C. players
People from Forfar
Footballers from Angus, Scotland